Río Seco (Spanish for "dry river") is a river located on the southern coastal valley region of Puerto Rico. It originates at
The river has a length of approximately 8 miles emptying into the Bay of Jobos.

References

External links
Rios de Puerto Rico

Rivers of Puerto Rico